Beauty Pool is a hot spring in the Upper Geyser Basin of Yellowstone National Park in the United States.

It is connected to the nearby Chromatic Spring. When the water level in one of the two pools rises and overflows, the water level in the other decreases. These fluctuations in water level take place over periods ranging from a few weeks to several years. During this energy shift, the temperatures can change about 10 °F. Its temperature ranges from

References 

Geothermal features of Yellowstone National Park
Hot springs of Wyoming
Geothermal features of Teton County, Wyoming
Hot springs of Teton County, Wyoming